List of medalists at the European Shooting Championships

Men

10 m air pistol

50 m pistol

10 m air rifle

50 m rifle three positions

Women

10 m air pistol

25 m pistol

10 m air rifle

50 m rifle prone

50 m rifle three positions

Mixed

10 m air pistol

10 m air rifle

See also
 List of medalists at the European Shotgun Championships

References

External links
European Champion Archive Results at Sport-komplett-de
ISSF Results Overview

Medalists in shooting
Lists of sport shooters